Manang Air Pvt. Ltd. is a helicopter airline based in Kathmandu, Nepal and was founded in 1997 and has been operating helicopters in commercial air transportation within the Nepalese territory under the Regulation of Civil Aviation Authority of Nepal. The company provides chartered services and is focused on personalized services such as adventure flights helicopter excursions or expedition work. It is the only Approved Training Organization in Nepal.

History
The airline started operations with a single Mil Mi-17 helicopter in 1997. It resumed its flights in 2014 after three years, after the company had stopped its service in 2009 after its MI-17 helicopter was involved in an accident.

Fleet

Current fleet
The Manang Air fleet consists of the following aircraft (as of October 2022):

Former fleet

Accidents and incidents 
 15 November 2009 - A Manang Air MI-17 helicopter crashed on a cargo mission. The chopper had left Surkhet Airport at 10:30 a.m. with supplies including pipes meant for setting up a drinking water supply system in Rodikot in Humla District. The accident occurred at 11:15 a.m. A Russian flight engineer was killed in the accident, and five other people were injured.
 10 June 2017 - A Manang Air helicopter en route to Gosainkunda from Kathmandu crash-landed at Gosainkunda Helipad incurring minor damages. There were no human casualties.
 14 August 2018 - A Manang Air Eurocopter AS350's tail rotor hit and killed an Indian passenger upon disembarking in Hilsa, Nepal. Following this, the Civil Aviation Authority of Nepal temporarily suspended the airline's operations. 
 14 April 2019 - A Manang Air Eurocopter AS350 registration 9N-ALC parked at the helipad of Lukla Airport was destroyed when a Let 410 registration 9N-AMH operated by Summit Air veered of the runway while taking off for Ramechhap. Two helicopters of Manang Air were hit by the plane. The first officer of the flight died in the accident as well as two security officers on the ground near the runway. Several people were injured.

References

External links
 

Airlines of Nepal
1997 establishments in Nepal